Eliezer Mizrahi (born 19 April 1945) is an Israeli former politician who served as a member of the Knesset between 1988 and 1992, and as Deputy Minister of Health from 1990 until 1992.

Biography
Born in Rehovot during the Mandate era, Mizrahi's father Ya'akov was an Agudat Yisrael politician. He was educated the Chabad-run Tomchei Temimim yeshiva. He worked as a diamond polisher.

In 1988 he was elected to the Knesset on the Agudat Yisrael list. He was involved in the dirty trick in 1990, which resulted in him breaking away from the party to establish a new faction, Geulat Yisrael. He joined Yitzhak Shamir's government, and was appointed Deputy Minister of Health on 25 June. He lost his seat in the 1992 elections after the party failed to cross the electoral threshold. He later joined Likud and was placed thirty-fifth on the party's list for the 1996 elections, but failed to win a seat.

References

External links

1945 births
Israeli Jews
People from Rehovot
Jews in Mandatory Palestine
Leaders of political parties in Israel
Living people
Agudat Yisrael politicians
Likud politicians
Geulat Yisrael politicians
Israeli people of Yemeni-Jewish descent
Members of the 12th Knesset (1988–1992)
Deputy ministers of Israel